Eastham is a village and civil parish  in the Malvern Hills District in  the county of Worcestershire, England.

Eastham was in the upper division of Doddingtree Hundred.

In 2016 Eastham bridge collapsed.  The  Grade II listed monument was demolished and a replacement bridge was constructed  which opened on 27 April 2017.

References

Villages in Worcestershire
Civil parishes in Worcestershire
Malvern Hills District